Ghilianella borincana is a species of true bug found in semi-evergreen forest of Puerto Rico. It is highly cryptic, using catalepsis.

References

Reduviidae
Arthropods of Puerto Rico